SJHS may refer to several high schools:

Canada
Saint John High School, Saint John, New Brunswick, Canada
St. Joseph High School (Ottawa) Ottawa, Ontario, Canada

Philippines
St. James High School (Philippines), Buenavista, Agusan del Norte

United States
(Smith Jr. High) ⬅Middle School. Home of the Sideswinders Located In⬇⬇⬇⬇⬇⬇⬇
Mesa, Arizona United States]
Stonewall Jackson High School (Prince William County, Virginia)
Stonewall Jackson High School (Shenandoah County, Virginia)
Stonewall Jackson High School (Kanawha County, West Virginia), closed 1989
Saint Jerome High School, Holyoke, Massachusetts
San Jose High School, San Jose, California
Seminole Junior High School Seminole, Texas

See also
Saint Joseph High School (disambiguation)